is a Japanese film score composer. Morino frequently collaborates with composer Daisuke Yano and film director Ryuhei Kitamura. Nobuhiko and Kitamura attended the same high school.

Film scores

References

External links

Year of birth missing (living people)
Japanese film score composers
Japanese male film score composers
Living people